The 2018–19 Biathlon World Cup – Sprint Men started on Friday 7 December 2018 in Pokljuka and finished on Friday 22 March 2019 in Oslo Holmenkollen. The defending titlist was Martin Fourcade of France.

The small crystal globe winner for the category was Johannes Thingnes Bø of Norway.

Competition format
The  sprint race is the third oldest biathlon event; the distance is skied over three laps. The biathlete shoots two times at any shooting lane, first prone, then standing, totalling 10 targets. Competitors' starts are staggered, normally by 30 seconds.

2017–18 Top 3 standings

Medal winners

Standings

References

Sprint Men